José Luis Lorente Sanz (1902 – 2001) was a Spanish politician who served as acting Minister of Governance of Spain replacing outgoing minister Ramón Serrano Suñer between 1940 and 1941, during the Francoist dictatorship.

References

1902 births
2001 deaths
Interior ministers of Spain
Government ministers during the Francoist dictatorship